Pauline Delpech is a writer and a French actress who was born in 1981.

Biography
Her real name is Pauline Bidegaray; she took her stage name from her stepfather, singer Michel Delpech.

Career as an actress
Short films
 Man in the Box (2003)
 Device blues Slony Sow
 The trigeminal nerve by Jacques Richard
 7 Stephane Werger

TV movies and series
 R.I.S, police scientifique, in the eighth episode, a small part of the drifter addict accused of murder
 The Bobonbos Alain Belinea murmurs production in 2008
 Le Grand Restaurant (Pierre Palmade), directed and choreographed by Gerard Pullicino (2010)

Feature films
 Tears of Mr. lanches Ux (2004) Jordi Avalos,
 Disco de Fabien Onteniente (2007)
 Official Selection of Jacques Richard (2008), the leading female role alongside Manuel Blanc, Dani, Serge Khalfon, Michael Lonsdale, Gabrielle Lazure, Isabelle Pascot, Domnique Pinont.
 Courier of Renoh Hervé (2009)
 La croisière (2011)

Parts
 Window on torque Feydeau
 Damage to ego of Erwan Larher
 And if you went to Roman Girot
 I love you forever Rachel Moses.

In his projects, a role in the upcoming film by Patrick Levy: The Seasonal.

Books
She created the character of Commissioner Andrew George Barnaby, the central hero.
 Under the Black Snow, ed. Michel Lafon, January 2007, .
 And I'll burn your heart of stone, ed. Michel Lafon, February 2008, 
 The blood of doves, ed. Michel Lafon, June 2009
 In Northern Mists, ed. Michel Lafon, October 2009

References

1981 births
Living people
French women writers
French crime fiction writers
Place of birth missing (living people)
French stage actresses
French film actresses
French television actresses
Women crime fiction writers